Sakas is a novel by Jagadish Ghimire. It was published in August 2012 by Jagadish Ghimire Pratisthan.

This book is not only sufferings of an individual person or a village or a district or an area but a Nepal as a whole. This is a suffering of the public who are exiled and displaced without any crime. It is a highly specialized downright narrative Nepalese novel written in an innovative style by Jagadish Ghimire.

Synopsis 
Kumari is a girl who had been raped by her father. A man helps her go to kathmandu for education and they send her dad to prison. When she becomes a nurse she falls in love with a boy. Then she doesn't want to live in Kathmandu she goes to Janakpur.

Characters 

 Sharad Kumar
 Kumari Nepali
 Haribansha Adhikari (jiba)
 Sabita (jima)
 Shanti
 Devi jee
 Mr Jha
 Laal(bhaiya jee)
 Mithila
 Dinesh

See also 

 Antarmanko Yatra
 Phirphire
 Seto Dharti

References 

Nepalese novels
2012 Nepalese novels
21st-century Nepalese novels
Nepali-language novels
Novels set in Nepal